The Rover Two-litre was a mid-size luxury open tourer, saloon or limousine produced from 1927 by the Rover Company of Coventry and available through to 1932. As usual the chassis was also available to coach builders.

The 16hp Two-litre was supplemented by then later replaced by the much more expensive better equipped 2-litre Rover Meteor 16 announced in February 1930.

Overview 
Announced in September 1927 the Rover Two-litre was one of the Rover cars manufactured when Spencer and Maurice Wilks, who joined Rover's team in 1929 and 1930, introduced new management practices and engineering techniques to Rover.

Engine
The Two-litre was powered by a watercooled 2 L straight-6 OHV engine with an output of 45 bhp at 3600 rpm designed by Peter Poppe, which allowed a maximum speed of 60 mph (97 km/h). The bore of 65 mm put the engine into the 16 hp taxation class.  Poppe's new engine became the basis for all but one of the Rover engines until the new design introduced with Rover's P3 in 1948.

The car was supplied with a three-speed gearbox controlled by a lever in the centre of the car. The lever was flexible, operated in a gate and had a stop to avoid engaging reverse.

The engine clutch and gearbox assembly is mounted and supported at three points, the single one in front, the rear pair by horizontally U-shaped leaf spring attachments.

Brakes suspension steering
The suspension was conventional for the time with half elliptic leaf springs all round mounted above the axles. The pedal brakes work shoes in enclosed drums on all four wheels by rods but the handbrake uses those on the back wheels and operates  them by chain. There are shock absorbers fore and aft.

Body
As with its predecessors standard bodies were very light weight rattle free fabric bodywork built by Rover under licence from Weymann. The standard 2/3-seater or 5-seater open tourer 2-litre was introduced at a price of £410. A short wheelbase two-door "Sportsman's Saloon"  version became available during the last two years of production for £335. All cars became available with a 4-speed gearbox as an optional extra  for £7, it was a standard fitting to the limousine.

The clutch pedal is adjustable for travel and the front seat can be adjusted over a range of six inches using wing nuts in the cushion.

The short-wheelbase narrow track sportsman's saloon variant of this Two-litre car, the Rover Light Six won attention when it was the first successful participant in the Blue Train Races, a series of record-breaking attempts between automobiles and trains in the late 1920s and early 1930s. It saw a number of motorists and their own or sponsored automobiles race against the Le Train Bleu, a train that ran between Calais and the French Riviera.

References

External links
Images
  coachbuilt saloon, standard model
 Weymann saloon
 Sportsman's Coupé (not Light Six)

T litre
Cars introduced in 1927
1920s cars
1930s cars